Joseph Gyamfi is a Ghanaian politician and member of the first parliament of the fourth republic of Ghana representing Sunyani West Constituency under the membership of the National Democratic Congress.

Early life and education 
Joseph was born on 22 January 1954. He attended University of Ghana where he obtained his Bachelor of Arts in political science. He worked as a teacher before going into parliament.

Politics 
Joseph began his political career in 1992 when he became the parliamentary candidate for the National Democratic Congress (NDC) to represent his constituency in the Brong-Ahafo region of Ghana prior to the commencement of the 1992 Ghanaian parliamentary election. He was elected into the first parliament of the fourth republic of Ghana on 7 January 1993 after being pronounced winner at the 1992 Ghanaian election held on 29 December 1992. He lost his candidacy to his fellow party comrade Kwadwo Nyamekye-Marfo who lost to Kwadwo Adjei Darko of the New Patriotic Party at the 1996 Ghanaian general elections. Kwadwo Nyamekye-Marfo polled 37.90% of the total valid votes cast which was equivalent to 13,204 votes but his opponent polled 39.50% of the total valid votes cast which was equivalent to 13,737 votes.

References 

Living people
1954 births
Ghanaian MPs 1993–1997
University of Ghana alumni
People from Brong-Ahafo Region